Varuvan Vadivelan is a 1978 Indian Tamil-language devotional film directed by K. Shankar.<ref>{{Cite web |date=22 July 2019 |title=பக்திப் படங்களின் வருகை குறைந்தது எதனால்?!" கலைஞானம், சுரேஷ் கிருஷ்ணா விளக்கம் |url=https://cinema.vikatan.com/tamil-cinema/what-has-caused-the-decline-of-devotional-films |url-access=subscription |url-status=live |archive-url=https://web.archive.org/web/20210823044913/https://cinema.vikatan.com/tamil-cinema/what-has-caused-the-decline-of-devotional-films |archive-date=23 August 2021 |access-date=23 August 2021 |website=Ananda Vikatan |language=ta}}</ref> The film stars Jai Ganesh, R. Muthuraman, Vijayakumar, Jayachitra, Fatafat Jayalaxmi, Latha, Chandrakala and Padmapriya. It was released on 15 May 1978.

 Plot 

 Cast 
Jai Ganesh as Baskar
R. Muthuraman as Doctor, Baskar's Brother
Vijayakumar as Vijay
Jayachitra as Sengamalam
Fatafat Jayalaxmi as Vijay's Wife
Latha as Uma
Chandrakala
Padmapriya
Bhavani
Thengai Srinivasan as Alli's Husband
Manorama as Alli
V. S. Raghavan as Uma's Father
M. N. Nambiar as Velagiri, Sengamalam's father
Nagesh as Vijay's brother
Baby Sudha as Vadivelan

 Production 
Latha was initially cast but later removed.

 Soundtrack 
The music was composed by M. S. Viswanathan, with lyrics by Kannadasan.

 Accolades Varuvan Vadivelan'' won the Tamil Nadu State Film Awards for Best Child Artist (Baby Sudha), Best Music Director (Viswanathan) and Special Prize for Best Film.

References

External links 
 

1970s Tamil-language films
1978 films
Films directed by K. Shankar
Films scored by M. S. Viswanathan
Films shot in Malaysia
Films shot in Singapore
Films shot in Sri Lanka
Hindu devotional films